In mathematics, specifically in the study of ordinary differential equations, the Peano existence theorem, Peano theorem or Cauchy–Peano theorem, named after Giuseppe Peano and Augustin-Louis Cauchy, is a fundamental theorem which guarantees the existence of solutions to certain initial value problems.

History
Peano first published the theorem in 1886 with an incorrect proof. In 1890 he published a new correct proof using successive approximations.

Theorem
a continuous function and 
a continuous, explicit first-order differential equation defined on D, then every initial value problem 
for f with 
has a local solution 
such that  for all .

The solution need not be unique: one and the same initial value  may give rise to many different solutions .

Proof
As  is open there is a rectangle .

Without loss of generality, we assume  for all .

We define Picard iterations  as follows, where . They are well-defined by induction: as

We have

Thus for maximal difference , we have a bound , and

The functions  are equicontinuous as for  we have

so by the Arzelà–Ascoli theorem they are relatively compact. In particular, for each  there is a subsequence 
converging uniformly to a continuous function . Taking limit
 in

we conclude that . The functions  are in the closure of a relatively compact set, so they are themselves relatively compact. Thus there is a subsequence  converging uniformly to a continuous function . Taking limit  in  we conclude that , using the fact that  are equicontinuous by the Arzelà–Ascoli theorem.

Related theorems
The Peano theorem can be compared with another existence result in the same context, the Picard–Lindelöf theorem. The Picard–Lindelöf theorem both assumes more and concludes more. It requires Lipschitz continuity, while the Peano theorem requires only continuity; but it proves both existence and uniqueness where the Peano theorem proves only the existence of solutions. To illustrate, consider the ordinary differential equation

 on the domain 

According to the Peano theorem, this equation has solutions, but the Picard–Lindelöf theorem does not apply since the right hand side is not Lipschitz continuous in any neighbourhood containing 0. Thus we can conclude existence but not uniqueness.

The Carathéodory existence theorem is a generalization of the Peano existence theorem with weaker conditions than continuity.

Notes

References
 
 
 
 

Augustin-Louis Cauchy
Theorems in analysis
Ordinary differential equations